Guy Owen may refer to:

 Guy Owen (figure skater) (1913–1952), Canadian figure skater
 Guy Owen (novelist) (1925–1981), American novelist